Rick (Richard) Cook (born 1960) is a New York City architect best known for designing the Bank of America Tower at One Bryant Park, a  skyscraper that is the first commercial high rise to receive the United States Green Building Council's Leadership in Energy and Environmental Design (LEED) Platinum Certification.

In 1992, Cook became a founding partner in the firm Richard Cook & Associates. He developed a portfolio ranging from master planning to various commercial and residential projects, including The Caroline, one of the largest new buildings ever completed in a New York City historic district; the Chelsea Grande, which received a Charter Award from the Congress for New Urbanism; and 360 Madison Avenue, which was called "the best new building in years" by the New York Sun.

Cook joined with his longtime mentor and friend Robert F. Fox, Jr. to form COOKFOX, LLP (formerly Cook+Fox Architects) in 2003. To date, COOKFOX has completed 3 LEED Platinum projects in New York City, including the firm's own office, Skanska's full floor office in the Empire State Building and the Bank of America Tower. COOKFOX designed the award-winning redevelopment of the Historic South Street Seaport neighborhood, which received an AIA-NY/Boston Society of Architects Honor Award for Housing Design, and the new Henry Miller's Theatre- the first green Broadway theater.  COOKFOX also designed the Center for Friends Without a Border, a visitor's center for the Angkor Hospital for Children in Siem Reap, Cambodia. As part of their involvement with this project, COOKFOX implemented “The Green Initiative,” a social venture to fund five local NGOs through the production of sustainable fuels; the project was a semi-finalist in the 2010 Buckminster Fuller Challenge.

Cook and Fox partnered with Bill Browning in 2006 to form Terrapin Bright Green LLC, an environmental consulting and strategic planning firm.

Cook was born in Massachusetts and grew up in Latham, New York. He attended Syracuse University, where he graduated cum laude with a Bachelor of Architecture in 1983 and was awarded the Norman J. Wiedersom Traveling Fellowship to study in Florence, Italy. Cook resides in Palisades, New York, with his wife and children.

External links 
COOKFOX Architects, LLP
Terrapin Bright Green
US Green Building Council

References 

Living people
20th-century American architects
1960 births
21st-century American architects
Architects from Massachusetts
Architects from New York (state)
People from Latham, New York
Syracuse University School of Architecture  alumni